Babak Latifi (born September 14, 1987) is an Iranian former footballer who played as a forward.

Career
Latifi joined Fajr Sepasi after spending the previous season at Shahin.

Club career statistics

References

External links 
Babak Latifi at PersianLeague.com

Iranian footballers
Association football forwards
Zob Ahan Esfahan F.C. players
Steel Azin F.C. players
Shahin Bushehr F.C. players
Fajr Sepasi players
1987 births
Living people